The 2003 European Baseball Championship was won and hosted by the Netherlands.

Standings

European Baseball Championship
European Baseball Championship
2003
2003 in Dutch sport